A fourteen-part referendum was held in Ecuador on 25 May 1997. Voters were asked whether they approved of the dismissal of President Abdalá Bucaram by the National Congress, the appointment of Fabián Alarcón as interim President for twelve months, the calling of a Constitutional Assembly, whether a Constitutional Assembly should be elected by direct elections or by appointment, whether spending limits should be introduced for election campaigns, whether voters should be able to modify electoral lists, whether National Assembly elections should be held alongside the first or second round of presidential elections, whether political parties that fail to cross the 5% threshold in two consecutive elections should be deregistered, whether the Supreme Electoral Tribunal (TSE) should reflect the political makeup of the National Congress, whether the National Congress should appoint managers of state-owned companies with a two-thirds majority, reforms to the justice system, allowing the Supreme Court to appoint judicial authority member, whether elected officials who commit a criminal offence should be removed from office, and whether the National Assembly should implement the 13 proposals. All eleven proposals were approved by voters.

After all yes/no questions were approved, a Constitutional Assembly was subsequently elected in 1997 and produced a new constitution which entered into force on 10 August 1998.

Background
On 6 February 1997 the Constitutional Assembly had removed President Bucaram from office due to "mental retardation". However, it had not been done by a majority of 67 of the 100 members as proscribed by the constitution. On 8 April interim President Alarcón issued decree 201, calling a referendum on 14 questions, as allowed by article 58 of the constitution.

Results

Yes/no questions

Method of election of a Constitutional Assembly

Timing of National Assembly elections

References

Referendums in Ecuador
1997 in Ecuador
1997 referendums
Electoral reform referendums
Electoral reform in Ecuador